En Vivo (English Live) is the sixth album by Mexican pop singer, Ana Gabriel. It was released on 1990. This album reached No. 1 in the Billboard Latin Pop Albums. It has sold 4,3 million worldwide, so far, this made her the first female singer in Spanish language in concert to accomplish that. This was her first live material and was nominated for Pop Album of the Year at the Lo Nuestro Awards of 1992.

Track listing
Tracks:
 En la Oscuridad - 04:39
 Mar Y Arena - 03:18
 Amor - 04:14
 Es el Amor Quien Llega - 03:45
 Pecado Original - 03:24
Quien Como Tu - 03:29
 Ay Amor - 03:06
 Destino - 03:55
 Hasta Que Te Conocí - 03:39
 Propuesta - 03:21
 Solamente Una Vez - 02:31
 Ni Un Roce (featuring Rosana) - 04:37
 Y Aquí Estoy - 03:43
 Soledad - 03:47
 Simplemente Amigos - 03:31
 Hice Bien En Quererte - 04:46

Album chart
This release reached the No. 1 position on the Billboard Latin Pop Albums chart, her third album to top the chart.

See also
List of number-one Billboard Latin Pop Albums from the 1990s

Album certifications

References

Ana Gabriel live albums
1990 live albums
Spanish-language live albums